The 1960 Vermont gubernatorial election took place on November 8, 1960. Incumbent Republican Robert Stafford did not run for re-election to a second term as Governor of Vermont. Republican candidate F. Ray Keyser Jr. defeated Democratic candidate Russell F. Niquette to succeed him.

This marks the last time in Vermont history that the elected Governor was of the same party as the outgoing Governor.

Republican primary

Results

Democratic primary

Results

General election

Results

References

Vermont
1960
Gubernatorial
November 1960 events in the United States